Centrale FS is a station on Lines 2 and 3 of the Milan Metro in Milan, Italy. The Line 2 station was opened on 27 April 1970 as a one-station extension from Caiazzo. On 21 July 1971, the line was extended to Garibaldi FS. The Line 3 station was opened on 1 May 1990 as part of the inaugural section of the line between Duomo and Centrale. Initially, Duomo was connected with Centrale by shuttle service, and on 16 December 1990, with the extension of the line to Porta Romana, full-scale service started. The station remained the terminus of Line 3 until 12 May 1991, when Sondrio was opened.

The station is located just under the Milano Centrale railway station. The station is underground with two tracks in a single tunnel both for Line 3 and Line 2, Line 2 running deeper than Line 3. The station also serves the Pirelli Tower.

References

External links

Line 2 (Milan Metro) stations
Line 3 (Milan Metro) stations
Railway stations opened in 1970
1970 establishments in Italy
Railway stations in Italy opened in the 20th century